John Reeves Jones Daniel (January 13, 1802 – June 22, 1868) was a Congressional Representative from North Carolina.

Daniel was born near Halifax, North Carolina and was instructed privately at home. He graduated from the University of North Carolina at Chapel Hill in 1821. After studying law, he was admitted to the North Carolina bar in 1823 and practiced law in Halifax. He was elected to the State house of commons, serving from 1832–34. Daniel was elected attorney general of North Carolina in 1834. The popular politician was elected as a Democrat to the Twenty-seventh United States Congress and to the five succeeding Congresses (March 4, 1841 – March 4, 1853), where he served as Chairman of the Committee on Claims (Twenty-ninth, Thirty-first, and Thirty-second Congresses). Daniel was not a candidate for renomination in 1852 to the Thirty-third Congress. He retired from politics and resumed the practice of law in Halifax. He moved to Louisiana in 1860 and settled near Shreveport, where he continued the practice of law and also engaged in planting. He died in Shreveport and was buried there.

His son, Junius Daniel, became a brigadier general in the Confederate States Army, dying as a result of a mortal wound at the Battle of Spotsylvania Court House in 1864.

See also 
 Twenty-seventh United States Congress
 Twenty-ninth United States Congress
 Twenty-eighth United States Congress
 Thirtieth United States Congress
 Thirty-second United States Congress
 Thirty-first United States Congress

External links 
 U.S. Congressional Biographical Directory

Democratic Party members of the North Carolina House of Representatives
North Carolina Attorneys General
1802 births
1868 deaths
People from Halifax, North Carolina
Democratic Party members of the United States House of Representatives from North Carolina
19th-century American politicians